The Tokyo Roller Girls is a women's flat track roller derby league based in Tokyo, Japan. Founded in 2010, Tokyo is a member of the Women's Flat Track Derby Association (WFTDA).

As of 2020, the league consists of Neon Roller Monsters, in Tokyo, and Yokosuka Sushi Rollers, in Yokosuka.

History
The league was founded in 2010 by Jennifer and Talia Moretty, an American military family stationed in Japan Yokosuka Naval Base.  It grew with the addition of teams located at the Yokota Air Base and Camp Zama, also consisting principally of American service personnel.  In 2012, the Tokyo Bomber Girls was founded, a team of mostly Japanese skaters based in the capital city.

In October 2012, Tokyo Roller Girls was accepted as a member of the Women's Flat Track Derby Association Apprentice Programme, and it became a full member of the WFTDA in June 2013.

WFTDA rankings

References

Sports competitions in Tokyo
Roller derby leagues established in 2010
Roller derby leagues in Japan
Women's Flat Track Derby Association Division 3
2010 establishments in Japan